Carl L. Ford (born July 11, 1957) is a  Republican member of the North Carolina Senate representing the 33rd district.  He previously represented the 76th district in the North Carolina House of Representatives.

Electoral history

2020

2018

2016

2014

2012

References

|-

Living people
1957 births
People from Kannapolis, North Carolina
People from China Grove, North Carolina
Businesspeople from North Carolina
21st-century American politicians
Republican Party members of the North Carolina House of Representatives
Republican Party North Carolina state senators